Tatyana Anatolyevna Protsenko (8 April 1968 – 19 May 2021) was a Soviet actress, best known for her role as Malvina in the 1975 film The Adventures of Buratino.

Biography 
Tatyana Protsenko was born on 8 April 1968 in Moscow, USSR. Her father was the chief of the documentary film directorate of Goskino USSR, and her mother was an air traffic controller in Moscow international airport Vnukovo.

An assistant to film director Leonid Nechayev looking for an actress to undertake the part of Malvina in a fairytale film, later to be released as The Adventures of Buratino, saw Tatyana, then about five years old, on a journey in a train, and invited her to take part in the casting. Tatyana passed it successfully and was awarded the role. With the film being a huge success, Tatyana rose to nation-wide fame overnight. 

Her participation in the film was so highly appreciated that the next film to be made by Leonid Nechayev, About the Little Red Riding Hood, was specifically designed to star Tatyana as the main character. However, this did not happen because of a trauma Tatyana got by falling off a bicycle shortly before the start of filming, and the role was eventually assigned to another actress. Tatyana had not another chance to appear in feature films. Later she got a degree from the Gerasimov Institute of Cinematography and worked at the Rolan Bykov Centre. She was also a member of the International Federation of Journalists. She wrote poems and had a book of her poetry published. 

Tatyana Protsenko died of cancer, after fighting the disease for three years, on 19 May 2021 in Moscow. Despite the fact that as an actress she took part only in one film, the news of her demise was reported by major Russian mass media and spread across social media.

Tatyana Protsenko has been survived by her husband and two children.

References

External links 
 
 Poems by Tatyana Protsenko (official, Russian)

1968 births
2021 deaths
Soviet child actresses
Soviet film actresses
Soviet actresses
Gerasimov Institute of Cinematography alumni
Actresses from Moscow